The European Individual Speedway Junior Championship is an annual speedway event organized by the European Motorcycle Union (UEM) since 1998.

Championship History
Between 1977 and 1988 the FIM) held the Speedway European Under 21 Championship. After deciding to allow non-European competitors, the competition was renamed the World Under 21 Championship. The European Junior Championship was then inaugurated in 1998, under the control of the European Motorcycle Union (UEM). It was held for riders under 21 years of age.

In 2021, the age limit was reduced from under 21 years of age to under 19 years of age (there had been an under 19 championship previously).

Age limit
1998 to 2020 (under 21)
2021 to present (under 19)

Previous winners

Under 19 champions (before 2021 age limit change)

References

 
Individual 19